ERTA may refer to:

 Erta, Italian ski slope
 Ertapenem, carbapenem antibiotic medication